The Battle of Appomattox Court House, fought in Appomattox County, Virginia, on the morning of April 9, 1865, was one of the last battles of the American Civil War (1861–1865). It was the final engagement of Confederate General in Chief, Robert E. Lee, and his Army of Northern Virginia before they surrendered to the Union Army of the Potomac under the Commanding General of the United States Army, Ulysses S. Grant. 

Lee, having abandoned the Confederate capital of Richmond, Virginia after the nine-and-a-half-month Siege of Petersburg and Richmond, retreated west, hoping to join his army with the remaining Confederate forces in North Carolina, the Army of Tennessee under Gen. Joseph E. Johnston. Union infantry and cavalry forces under General Philip Sheridan pursued and cut off the Confederates' retreat at the central Virginia village of Appomattox Court House. Lee launched a last-ditch attack to break through the Union forces to his front, assuming the Union force consisted entirely of lightly armed cavalry. When he realized that the cavalry was now backed up by two corps of federal infantry, he had no choice but to surrender with his further avenue of retreat and escape now cut off as, if he hadn't, his forces would have been demolished.

The signing of the surrender documents occurred in the parlor of the house owned by Wilmer McLean on the afternoon of April 9. On April 12, a formal ceremony of parade and the stacking of arms led by Confederate Maj. Gen. John B. Gordon to federal Brig. Gen. Joshua Chamberlain marked the disbandment of the Army of Northern Virginia with the parole of its nearly 28,000 remaining officers and men, free to return home without their major weapons but enabling men to take their horses and officers to retain their sidearms (swords and pistols), and effectively ending the war in Virginia. 

This event triggered a series of subsequent surrenders across the South, in North Carolina, Alabama and finally Shreveport, Louisiana, for the Trans-Mississippi Theater in the West by June, signaling the end of the four-year-long war.

Background

Military situation

The final campaign for Richmond, Virginia, the capital of the Confederate States, began when the Union Army of the Potomac crossed the James River in June 1864. The armies under the command of  Lieutenant General and General in Chief Ulysses S. Grant (1822–1885) laid siege to Petersburg, south of Richmond, intending to cut the two cities' supply lines and force the Confederates to evacuate. In the spring of 1865, Confederate States Army Gen. Robert E. Lee (1807–1870), waited for an opportunity to leave the Petersburg lines, aware that the position was untenable, but Union troops made the first move. On April 1, 1865, Maj. Gen. Philip Sheridan's cavalry turned Lee's flank at the Battle of Five Forks. The next day Grant's army achieved a decisive breakthrough, effectively ending the Petersburg siege. With supply railroad lines cut, Lee's men abandoned the trenches they had held for ten months and evacuated on the night of April 2–3.

Lee's first objective was to reassemble and supply his men at Amelia Courthouse. His plan was to link up with Gen. Joseph E. Johnston's Army of Tennessee in North Carolina and go on the offensive after establishing defenses on the Roanoke River in southwest Virginia. When the troops arrived at Amelia on April 4, however, they found no provisions. Lee sent wagons out to the surrounding country to forage, but as a result lost a day's worth of marching time. The army then headed west to Appomattox Station, where another supply train awaited him. Lee's army was now composed of the cavalry corps and two small infantry corps.

En route to the station, on April 6 at Sailor's Creek, nearly one fourth of the retreating Confederate army was cut off by Sheridan's cavalry and elements of the II and VI Corps. Two Confederate divisions fought the VI Corps along the creek. The Confederates attacked but were driven back, and soon after the Union cavalry cut through the right of the Confederate lines. Most of the 7,700 Confederates were captured or surrendered, including Lt. Gen. Richard S. Ewell and eight other general officers. The delay prevented Lee from reaching the Appomattox station until late afternoon on April 8, allowing Sheridan to reach the station ahead of the Southerners that evening, where he captured Lee's supplies and obstructed his path.

Following the minor battles of Cumberland Church and High Bridge, on April 7, General Grant sent a note to Lee suggesting that it was time to surrender the Army of Northern Virginia. In a return note, Lee refused the request, but asked Grant what terms he had in mind. On April 8, Union cavalry under Brig. Gen. and Brevet Maj. Gen. George Armstrong Custer captured and burned three supply trains waiting for Lee's army at the Appomattox Station. Now both of the Federal forces, the Army of the Potomac and the Army of the James, were converging on Appomattox.

With his supplies at Appomattox destroyed, Lee now looked west to the railway at Lynchburg, where more supplies awaited him. However, on the morning of April 8 a battalion of the 15th Pennsylvania Cavalry was detached from Stoneman's Raid into North Carolina and southwestern Virginia and had made a demonstration to within three miles of Lynchburg, giving the appearance of being the vanguard of a much larger force. Despite this new threat, Lee apparently decided to try for Lynchburg anyway.

While the Union Army was closing in on Lee, all that lay between Lee and Lynchburg was Union cavalry. Lee hoped to break through the cavalry before infantry arrived. He sent a note to Grant saying that he did not wish to surrender his army just yet but was willing to discuss how Grant's terms would affect the Confederacy. Grant, suffering from a throbbing headache, stated that "It looks as if Lee still means to fight." The Union infantry was close, but the only unit near enough to support Sheridan's cavalry was Maj. Gen. John Gibbon's XXIV Corps of the Army of the James. This corps traveled  in 21 hours to reach the cavalry. Maj. Gen. Edward O. C. Ord, commander of the Army of the James, arrived with the XXIV Corps around 4:00 a.m. while the V Corps of the Army of the Potomac was close behind. Sheridan deployed his three divisions of cavalry along a low ridge to the southwest of Appomattox Court House.

Opposing forces

Union

Confederate

April 9

Battle

At dawn on April 9, 1865, the Confederate Second Corps under Maj. Gen. John B. Gordon attacked Sheridan's cavalry and quickly forced back the first line under Brevet Brig. Gen. Charles H. Smith. The next line, held by Brig. Gens. Ranald S. Mackenzie and George Crook, slowed the Confederate advance. Gordon's troops charged through the Union lines and took the ridge, but as they reached the crest, they saw the entire Union XXIV Corps in line of battle with the Union V Corps to their right. Lee's cavalry saw these Union forces and immediately withdrew and rode off towards Lynchburg. Ord's troops began advancing against Gordon's corps while the Union II Corps began moving against Lt. Gen. James Longstreet's corps to the northeast. Colonel Charles Venable of Lee's staff rode in at this time and asked for an assessment, and Gordon gave him a reply he knew Lee did not want to hear: "Tell General Lee I have fought my corps to a frazzle, and I fear I can do nothing unless I am heavily supported by Longstreet's corps."  Upon hearing it Lee finally stated the inevitable: "Then there is nothing left for me to do but to go and see General Grant, and I would rather die a thousand deaths."

Many of Lee's officers, including Longstreet, agreed that surrendering the army was the only option left. The only notable officer opposed to surrender was Longstreet's chief of artillery, Brig. Gen. Edward Porter Alexander, who predicted that if Lee surrendered then "every other Confederate army will follow suit".

Lee decided to request a suspension of fighting while he sought to learn the terms of surrender Grant was proposing to offer. A white linen dish towel was used as a Confederate flag of truce and was carried by one of Longstreet's staff officers into the lines of General Custer, who was part of Sheridan's command. After a truce was arranged Custer was escorted through the lines to meet Longstreet. According to Longstreet, Custer said “in the name of General Sheridan I demand the unconditional surrender of this army.” Longstreet replied that he was not in command of the army, but if he were he would not deal with messages from Sheridan. Custer responded that it would be a pity to have more blood upon the field, to which Longstreet suggested that the truce be respected, and then added “General Lee has gone to meet General Grant, and it is for them to determine the future of the armies.”

At 8:00 a.m., Lee rode out to meet Grant, accompanied by three of his aides. Grant received Lee's first letter on the morning of April 9 as he was traveling to meet Sheridan. Grant recalled his migraine seemed to disappear when he read Lee's letter, and he handed it to his assistant Rawlins to read aloud before composing his reply:

Grant's response was remarkable in that it let the defeated Lee choose the place of his surrender. Lee received the reply within an hour and dispatched an aide, Charles Marshall, to find a suitable location for the occasion. Marshall scrutinized Appomattox Court House, a small village of roughly twenty buildings that served as a waystation for travelers on the Richmond-Lynchburg Stage Road. Marshall rejected the first house he saw as too dilapidated, instead settling on the 1848 brick home of Wilmer McLean. McLean had lived near Manassas Junction during the First Battle of Bull Run and had retired to Appomattox to escape the war.  (The site's historical irony has been written of: that farmer McLean, who relocated to avoid war after one of the Civil War's first battles happened on his land, would come to have the war's end negotiated in his sitting room.)

With gunshots still being heard on Gordon's front and Union skirmishers still advancing on Longstreet's front, Lee received a message from Grant. After several hours of correspondence between Grant and Lee, a cease-fire was enacted, and Grant received Lee's request to discuss surrender terms.

Surrender

Dressed in his ceremonial white uniform, Lee waited for Grant to arrive. Grant, whose headache had ended when he received Lee's note, arrived at the McLean house in a mud-spattered uniform—a government-issue sack coat with trousers tucked into muddy boots, no sidearms, and with only his tarnished shoulder straps showing his rank. It was the first time the two men had seen each other face-to-face in almost two decades. Suddenly overcome with sadness, Grant found it hard to get to the point of the meeting, and instead the two generals briefly discussed their only previous encounter, during the Mexican–American War. Lee brought the attention back to the issue at hand, and Grant offered the same terms he had before:

The terms were as generous as Lee could hope for; his men would not be imprisoned or prosecuted for treason. Officers were allowed to keep their sidearms, horses, and personal baggage. In addition to his terms, Grant also allowed the defeated men to take home their horses and mules to carry out the spring planting, and provided Lee with a supply of food rations for his starving army; Lee said it would have a very happy effect among the men and do much toward reconciling the country. The terms of the surrender were recorded in a document handwritten by Grant's adjutant Ely S. Parker, a Native American of the Seneca tribe, and completed around 4 p.m., April 9. Lee, upon discovering Parker to be a Seneca, remarked "It is good to have one real American here." Parker replied, "Sir, we are all Americans." As Lee left the house and rode away, Grant's men began cheering in celebration, but Grant ordered an immediate stop. "I at once sent word, however, to have it stopped", he said. "The Confederates were now our countrymen, and we did not want to exult over their downfall", he said. Custer and other Union officers purchased from McLean the furnishings of the room Lee and Grant met in as souvenirs, emptying it of furniture. Grant soon visited the Confederate army, and then he and Lee sat on the McLean home's porch and met with visitors such as Longstreet and George Pickett before the two men left for their capitals.

On April 10, Lee gave his farewell address to his army. The same day a six-man commission gathered to discuss a formal ceremony of surrender, even though no Confederate officer wished to go through with such an event. Brigadier General (brevet Major General) Joshua L. Chamberlain was the Union officer selected to lead the ceremony. In his memoirs entitled The Passing of the Armies, Chamberlain reflected on what he witnessed on April 12, 1865, as the Army of Northern Virginia marched in to surrender their arms and their colors:

Chamberlain's account has been questioned by historian William Marvel, who claims that "few promoted their own legends more actively and successfully than he did". Marvel points out that Chamberlain in fact did not command the federal surrender detail (but only one of the brigades in General Joseph J. Bartlett's division) and that he did not mention any "salute" in his contemporary letters, but only in his memoirs written many decades later when most other eyewitnesses had already died. Confederate General John Brown Gordon, in command of the Second Corps of the Army of Northern Virginia, did recall there was a salute and he cherished Chamberlain's act of saluting his surrendered army, calling Chamberlain "one of the knightliest soldiers of the Federal army." Gordon stated that Chamberlain "called his troops into line, and as my men marched in front of them, the veterans in blue gave a soldierly salute to the vanquished heroes." This statement by Gordon contradicts Marvel's perception of the event.

At the surrender ceremonies, about 28,000 Confederate soldiers passed by and stacked their arms. General Longstreet's account was 28,356 officers and men were “surrendered and paroled”. The Appomattox Roster lists approximately 26,300 men who surrendered.  This reference does not include the 7,700 who were captured at Sailor's Creek three days earlier, who were treated as prisoners of war.

Aftermath

While General George Meade (who was not present at the meeting) reportedly shouted that "it's all over" upon hearing the surrender was signed, roughly 175,000 Confederates remained in the field, but were mostly starving and disillusioned. Many of these were scattered throughout the South in garrisons or guerrilla bands while the rest were concentrated in three major Confederate commands. Just as Porter Alexander had predicted, as news spread of Lee's surrender other Confederate commanders realized that the strength of the Confederacy was gone, and decided to lay down their own arms.

General Joseph E. Johnston's army in North Carolina, the most threatening of the remaining Confederate armies, surrendered to Maj. Gen. William T. Sherman at Bennett Place in Durham, North Carolina on April 26, 1865. The 89,270 Confederate troops who laid down their weapons (the largest surrender of the war) marked the virtual end of the conflict. General Richard Taylor surrendered his army, the Departments of Alabama, Mississippi and East Louisiana, at Citronelle, Alabama on May 4, 1865. President Jefferson Davis met with his Confederate Cabinet for the last time on May 5, 1865 in Washington, Georgia, and officially dissolved the Confederate government. Davis and his wife Varina, along with their escort, were captured by Union forces on May 10 at Irwinville, Georgia.

Upon hearing about Lee's surrender, General Nathan Bedford Forrest, future leader of the Ku Klux Klan, also surrendered, reading his farewell address on May 9, 1865 at Gainesville, Alabama. General Edmund Kirby Smith surrendered the Confederate Trans-Mississippi Department on June 2, 1865, in Galveston, Texas. Also on May 26, 1865, the Camp Napoleon Council of Native American tribes, including a number that had sided with the Confederacy, met in Oklahoma and decided to have commissioners offer peace with the United States. Cherokee Chief and General Stand Watie, in command of 1st Cherokee Mounted Rifles, surrendered the last sizeable organized Confederate force on June 23, 1865 in Choctaw County, Oklahoma.

There were several more small battles after Lee's surrender. The Battle of Palmito Ranch, east of Brownsville, Texas, on May 12–13, 1865, is commonly regarded as the final land battle of the war (ironically a Confederate victory which was followed soon after by the surrender of the Confederate forces).

Lee never forgot Grant's magnanimity during the surrender, and for the rest of his life would not tolerate an unkind word about Grant in his presence. Confederate General Longstreet spoke well of Grant, saying he was grateful to Grant for a cheerful greeting and providing him a cigar at Appomattox, as well as later efforts by Grant to get Longstreet a pardon and appointing him to a federal position in New Orleans after Grant became president. Likewise, General John Brown Gordon cherished Chamberlain's simple act of saluting his surrendered army, calling Chamberlain "one of the knightliest soldiers of the Federal army."

Civil War commemorative stamps

During the Civil War Centennial, the United States Post Office issued five postage stamps commemorating the 100th anniversaries of famous battles, as they occurred over a four-year period, beginning with the Battle of Fort Sumter Centennial issue of 1961. The Battle of Shiloh commemorative stamp was issued in 1962, the Battle of Gettysburg in 1963, the Battle of the Wilderness in 1964, and the Appomattox Centennial commemorative stamp in 1965.

Battlefield preservation
The American Battlefield Trust and its battlefield land preservation partners have acquired and preserved  of the battlefield.

See also
 List of American Civil War battles
 Civil War Defenses of Washington
 Washington, D.C., in the American Civil War
 Bibliography of the American Civil War
 Bibliography of Abraham Lincoln
 Bibliography of Ulysses S. Grant
 Commemoration of the American Civil War on postage stamps

References 
Footnotes

Citations

Works cited

 
 Calkins, Chris. The Appomattox Campaign, March 29 – April 9, 1865. Conshohocken, PA: Combined Books, 1997. .
 Chamberlain, Joshua L. The Passing of the Armies: An Account of the Final Campaign of the Army of the Potomac. New York: Bantam Books, 1993. . First published 1915 by G.P. Putnam's Sons.
 Davis, Burke. To Appomattox: Nine April Days, 1865. New York: Eastern Acorn Press reprint, 1981. . First published New York: Rinehart, 1959.
 Eicher, David J. The Longest Night: A Military History of the Civil War. New York: Simon & Schuster, 2001. .
 Eicher, John H., and David J. Eicher. Civil War High Commands. Stanford, CA: Stanford University Press, 2001. .
 Freeman, Douglas S. R. E. Lee, A Biography. 4 vols. New York: Charles Scribner's Sons, 1934–35. .
 Gordon, John B. Reminiscences of the Civil War. New York: Charles Scribner's Sons, 1904.
 Grant, Ulysses S. Personal Memoirs of U. S. Grant. 2 vols. Charles L. Webster & Company, 1885–86. .
 Korn, Jerry, and the Editors of Time-Life Books. Pursuit to Appomattox: The Last Battles. Alexandria, VA: Time-Life Books, 1987. .
 Lee, Fitzhugh, General Lee; Great Commanders, D. Appleton and Company, 1894.
 Long, E. B. The Civil War Day by Day: An Almanac, 1861–1865. Garden City, NY: Doubleday, 1971. .
 Longstreet, James, From Manassas to Appomattox: Memoirs of the Civil War in America, J. B. Lippincott, 1908.
 Marvel, William. A Place called Appomattox. Chapel Hill: University of North Carolina Press, 2000.
 Marvel, William. Lee's Last Retreat. The Flight to Appomattox. Chapel Hill, The University of North Carolina Press, 2002. .
 Salmon, John S. The Official Virginia Civil War Battlefield Guide. Mechanicsburg, PA: Stackpole Books, 2001. .
 Silkenat, David. Raising the White Flag: How Surrender Defined the American Civil War. Chapel Hill: University of North Carolina Press, 2019. .
 Smith, Jean Edward. Grant. New York: Simon & Schuster, 2001. .
 
 Winik, Jay. April 1865: The Month That Saved America. New York: HarperCollins, 2006. . First published 2001.
 National Park Service Battle Summary
 CWSAC Report Update

Further reading
 Catton, Bruce. A Stillness at Appomattox. Garden City, NY: Doubleday and Company, 1953. .
 Dunkerly, Robert M. To the Bitter End: Appomattox, Bennett Place, and the Surrenders of the Confederacy. Emerging Civil War Series. El Dorado Hills, CA: Savas Beatie, 2015. .
 Marvel, William. A Place Called Appomattox. Chapel Hill: University of North Carolina Press, 1999. .
 Marvel, William. Lee's Last Retreat: The Flight to Appomattox. Chapel Hill: University of North Carolina Press, 2002. .
 Silkenat, David. Raising the White Flag: How Surrender Defined the American Civil War. Chapel Hill: University of North Carolina Press, 2019. .

External links

 Battle of Appomattox Court House: Battle maps, photos, history articles, and battlefield news (Civil War Trust)
 Confederate Surrender at Appomattox, Virginia, April 10, 1865.

1865 in Virginia
Appomattox Courthouse
Appomattox County, Virginia
Robert E. Lee
Ulysses S. Grant
Appomattox Courthouse
1865 in the American Civil War
Surrenders
Appomattox Courthouse
Appomattox Courthouse
April 1865 events
Battles commanded by Ulysses S. Grant